Oleg Viktorovich Seleznyov (22 July 1959 – 6 October 2021) was a Russian politician. He served as the member of the Federation Council of the Federal Assembly as the representative for the executive authority of Adygea from 2017 until his death.

Early life
Seleznyov was born on 22 July 1959.

Career
Over the course of his service in the Soviet, and later Russian Armed Forces, he was awarded the 
Order of the Red Star in 1987, and the Order of Military Merit in 1999. He saw service with KGB and the Federal Security Service (FSB), rising to the rank of major general. He served for a time as first deputy head of the FSB department in Krasnodar Krai, and in 2009 became head of the FSB department in Adygea. He held this post until July 2017.

On 10 September 2017, Head of the Republic of Adygea Murat Kumpilov appointed Seleznyov as a member of the Federation Council of the Federal Assembly, serving as the representative for the executive authority of Adygea. Seleznyov sat on the council's international affairs committee during his tenure.

Death
Seleznyov died from COVID-19 at a Krasnodar hospital on 6 October 2021, at the age of 62, during the COVID-19 pandemic in Russia. His death was announced by the head of the Federation Council's committee on regulations, . Chairwoman of the Federation Council Valentina Matviyenko sent a telegram of condolence to Murat Kumpilov, stating Seleznyov was "a responsible and principled politician who devoted his whole life to serving the Fatherland."

References 

1959 births
2021 deaths
20th-century Russian politicians
21st-century Russian politicians
Recipients of the Order of Military Merit (Russia)
Recipients of the Order of the Red Star
Members of the Federation Council of Russia (after 2000)
Russian major generals
Soviet military engineers
Russian military engineers
KGB officers
Deaths from the COVID-19 pandemic in Russia